= Malay Kumar Mazumder =

Malay Kumar Mazumder from Boston University was named Fellow of the Institute of Electrical and Electronics Engineers (IEEE) in 2012 for contributions to self-cleaning solar panels, and particle size and charge distribution analysis.
